The following is a list of awards and nominations for American actor Charlie Sheen. He won a Golden Globe award for Best Lead Actor in a Television Series - Comedy or Musical for his performance as Charlie Crawford on Spin City in 2002, and received two further nominations in 2005 and 2006 in the same category for his performance as Charlie Harper on Two and a Half Men. He has been nominated for four Primetime Emmy awards for Outstanding Lead Actor in a Comedy Series for the same role; these came in 2006, 2007, 2008, and 2009. Sheen also shared a Screen Actors Guild award nomination for Outstanding Performance by an Ensemble in a Motion Picture for Being John Malkovich in 2000, and received two nominations for Outstanding Performance by a Male Actor in a Comedy Series in 2005 and 2010. He was honored with a star on the Hollywood Walk of Fame for his contribution to Motion Picture in 1994.

Prestigious awards

Golden Globe awards 
1 win of 3 nominations

Primetime Emmy awards 
0 wins of 4 nominations

Screen Actors Guild awards 
0 wins of 3 nominations

Audience awards

Nickelodeon Kids' Choice awards 
0 wins of 1 nomination

People's Choice awards 
0 wins of 4 nominations

Teen Choice awards 
0 wins of 3 nominations

Critic and association awards

Award Circuit Community awards 
0 wins of 1 nomination

International awards

ALMA awards 
1 win of 5 nominations

Miscellaneous awards

Golden Raspberry awards 
0 wins of 1 nomination

TV Land awards 
1 win of 1 nomination

Walk of Fame Star 
1 win of 1 nomination

Western Heritage awards 
1 win of 1 nomination

References

Lists of awards received by American actor